Dead On: Relentless II is a 1992 thriller film directed by Michael Schroeder. The tagline for the movie was: The first killer was unpredictable. This one is unstoppable. The movie was filmed in Los Angeles, California. It is the second installment in the Relentless series.

Plot
L.A. Detective Sam Dietz (Leo Rossi), struggling to emotionally survive his previous big case (from in the first Relentless film) is unwillingly paired with a shady FBI agent Kyle Valsone (Ray Sharkey), during a case tracking another serial killer (Miles O'Keeffe), who kills seemingly at random. But every time Dietz gets a lead, Valsone gets in the way and somewhat throws off the investigation. Suspecting more than meets the eye, Dietz goes around the law to learn the identity of the killer and find out what Valsone is hiding and his connection to the killer. Meanwhile, Dietz's wife Carol (Meg Foster) now estranged from him due to his long hours, tries to deal with her current situation and their uncertain future.

Cast
 Ray Sharkey as Kyle Valsone
 Leo Rossi as Sam Dietz
 Meg Foster as Carol Dietz
 Marc Poppel as Paul Taglia
 Dale Dye as Captain Rivers
 Miles O'Keeffe as Gregor
 Allan Rich as Grazinsky
 Cylk Cozart as detective at precinct
 Art Kimbro as Henry
 Sven-Ole Thorsen as Mechanic (Patrick Vergano)
 Dawn Mangrum as reporter
 Leilani Jones as Belinda Belos
 Frank Rossi as cop at Mechanic's apartment
 Mindy Seeger as Francine
 Barbara Anne Klein as the realtor
 Perry Lang as Ralph Boshi

Other films in the series 
 Relentless (1989)
 Relentless 3 (1993)
 Relentless IV: Ashes to Ashes (1994)

References

External links
 
 

1992 films
1992 crime thriller films
American crime thriller films
American sequel films
CineTel Films films
1990s English-language films
Films directed by Michael Schroeder
1990s American films